Devil's rope may refer to
Devils Rope, a 2007 album by Kate Mann
Barbed wire
Cylindropuntia imbricata, Devil's rope cactus

See also
Devils Rope Barbed Wire Museum